"Blue World" is a 1983 single by the Moody Blues written by Justin Hayward.  It was first released as single in August 1983, and was later released on the album The Present. "Blue World" was one of three singles from The Present, with the others being "Sitting at the Wheel" and "Running Water." "Blue World" also referenced two earlier Moody Blues songs, "The Voice" and "Fly Me High". "Blue World" was a moderate success for the Moody Blues in the U.S., charting at #32 on the Mainstream Rock chart, and at #62 on the Billboard Hot 100 chart. In the UK it reached #35, proving to be their first UK Top 40 hit in ten years, barring a reissue of Nights in White Satin, and remains their last there to date. The single's cover is the painting Daybreak by Maxfield Parrish.

Ultimate Classic Rock critic Nick DeRiso rated it as the Moody Blues' 8th greatest song.

Personnel
Justin Hayward – vocals, guitar
John Lodge – bass guitar
Graeme Edge – drums
Patrick Moraz – keyboards

References

1983 singles
The Moody Blues songs
Songs written by Justin Hayward
Song recordings produced by Pip Williams
1983 songs